Azn Pride -This Iz the Japanese Kabuki Rock- is a greatest hits album released by Miyavi on 27 June 2008 for Taiwan and Korea and in Japan on 27 August 2008. The album covers Miyavi's career following his first major label single, "Rock no Gyakushuu/21sekikei Koushinkyoku". The album contains two original tracks, "As U R -Kimi wa Kimi no Mama de-" and "Wake Up Honey". It ranked 44th on Oricon and 54th on Billboard Japan.

The Japanese version of the album includes a second CD with the PV for "Tsurezure Naru Hibi Naredo" and a tour documentary covering the US and South American circuit of the "This Iz the Japanese Kabuki Rock Tour 2008".

Track listing

References

2008 greatest hits albums
Miyavi albums